The Deutscher Schlitten- und Bobsportverband (DSBV) was the governing body for the sports of luge and bobsleigh in the German Democratic Republic.

The DSBV was founded in 1957 under the umbrella of the larger Deutscher Turn- und Sportbund. It succeeded an earlier organization, founded in Oberhof in 1953. One of the smallest sports governing bodies in the GDR, the Deutscher Schlitten- und Bobsportverband had 3,759 athletes and 447 trainers in 1988.

Upon German reunification in 1990, the DSBV was absorbed into the German Bobsleigh and Sled Sport Association.

Presidents of the DSBV

References

Sports governing bodies in East Germany
Sports organizations established in 1957
Organizations disestablished in 1990
1957 establishments in East Germany
1990 disestablishments in Germany